Vinogradov Vasily Ivanovich (Vasili Vinogradov, ; 1874–1948) was an ethnically Russian Tatar opera composer, violinist and pedagogue. TASSR Honoured Worker of Culture (1944).

In collaboration with Ğäziz Älmöxämmädev and Soltan Ğäbäşi he composed first Tatar operas, Saniä (1925) and Eşçe (The Worker) (1930).

Vinogradov also composed many symphonic concertos, based on traditional Tatar and Bashkir music, music for dramatic plays, arrangement of folk music.

References and notes

1874 births
1948 deaths
Russian composers
Russian male composers
Soviet composers
Soviet male composers
Tatar music
20th-century Russian male musicians